Abed Rabah (born 9 June 1975) is a former Arab-Israeli professional association football player.

Biography
Rabah is a graduate of the Technion in Haifa. There he was trained as a building engineer.

Playing career 
Before the start of the 2008/09 season, Bnei Sakhnin was drawn against Spanish club Deportivo de La Coruña in the Intertoto Cup after defeating FK Renova in round two. When the team took off from Ben Gurion International Airport for the second leg in A Coruña, Abed Rabah was among a group of players stopped in the airport for allegedly stealing perfumes.

After the Intertoto Cup matches, Rabah requested to leave Bnei Sakhnin for his youth club, Ahva Arraba. Sakhnin refused to release him from his contract until they found a suitable replacement. As soon as Eitan Azaria signed with Sakhnin, Rabah was released on free transfer to Arraba.

Statistics

References

 

1975 births
Living people
Arab citizens of Israel
Arab-Israeli footballers
Israeli footballers
Israel international footballers
Association football defenders
Israeli Premier League players
Liga Leumit players
Bnei Sakhnin F.C. players
Hapoel Petah Tikva F.C. players
Ahva Arraba F.C. players
People from Arraba, Israel
Technion – Israel Institute of Technology alumni